Mbuni Football Club, also known as Mbuni FC, is a football club based in Arusha,Tanzania. The club currently plays in the Championship.

History 
Mbuni Football Club, also known as The Black, is a football club based in Monduli, one of the seven districts of Arusha.
It was founded in 1982 as an army team.

Colours and badge 
Mbuni FC's colours are red and blue.
The Mbuni FC badge has a football, an ostrich and a feather in the letter 'U' of Mbuni and the date of establishment.

Stadium 
Mbuni FC play their home matches at Amri Abeid Stadium, Arusha.Mbuni FC homeground a move from the Tanzania People’s Defence Force base in Monduli.

Supporters 
Apart from Monduli,Mbuni FC draws its fan base from Kaloleni, an administrative ward in the Arusha District of the Arusha Region of Tanzania.

Squad

Honours 
Winner First League 2021

References

External links 
 

Football clubs in Tanzania
Association football clubs established in 1982
Arusha